The discography of Australian rock and pop singer-songwriter Daryl Braithwaite.

Albums

Studio albums

Compilation albums

Singles

Other singles

See also
 Sherbet
 Sherbet discography
 Company of Strangers

References

Discographies of Australian artists
Rock music discographies
Pop music discographies